The Charleston Cougars men's basketball team is an NCAA Division I college basketball team competing in the Colonial Athletic Association. Home games are played at TD Arena, located on College of Charleston's campus in Charleston, South Carolina, United States. While a member of the NAIA, they were National Champions in 1983.

History
The College of Charleston has sponsored a men's basketball team since 1898. They have been NCAA Division I since 1991 in the Trans-Atlantic Athletic Conference (now ASUN Conference), the Southern Conference and presently the Colonial Athletic Association. In 2012, ESPN ranked Charleston as the 73rd best college basketball program in the previous 50 years, which was the highest ranking of all Division I teams in the state of South Carolina.

John Kresse era (1979–2001)
Under head coach John Kresse, the team had its greatest success. In 1983, the Cougars won the NAIA Championship. In the 1991–92 season, the Cougars made the jump to Division I and beat UNC–Charlotte in their first game. In the 1998–99 season, the team joined the Southern Conference, winning its only SoCon tournament championship that year. In 1994, 1997, 1998 and 1999, the Cougars reached the NCAA tournament, with a record of 1–4, beating Maryland in the opening round in 1997. In 1995 and 1996, the Cougars made the NIT.

The program's biggest regular season win in school history was over then-No. 3 North Carolina on the road on December 6, 1998. Kresse's career record at Charleston is 560–143.

Tom Herrion era (2002–06)
Many consider this a dark age for the program, as despite still recording winning seasons and a NIT berth in 2003. The Cougars' strength of schedule slid into decline and players with questionable reputations filled the roster. Tom Herrion's first Charleston team finished 25–8 in 2002–03, captured the Great Alaska Shootout title and advanced to the NIT. His 25 victories marked the highest total of any first-year NCAA Division I head coach during the 2002–03 season. Herrion also guided the Cougars to a 20–9 finish in 2003–04, 18–10 performance in 2004–05 and 17–11 record in 2005–06. Herrion's final record was 80–38.

Bobby Cremins era (2006–12)
The College of Charleston hired former Georgia Tech head coach Bobby Cremins in 2006. In each of Cremins' five complete seasons, Charleston won 20 games and Cremins won the SoCon Coach of the Year award in 2011. The Cougars played in a national postseason tournament in three consecutive seasons under Cremins, making the CBI in 2009 and 2010 and the NIT in 2011. During Cremins' tenure, the Cougars were put back in the national spotlight when they upset then-No.9 North Carolina on January 4, 2010 at TD Arena. He took a leave of absence during the 2011–2012 season due to exhaustion and retired at the conclusion of the season. His overall record at Charleston is 125–68.

Doug Wojcik era (2012–14)
Doug Wojcik, University of Tulsa's all-time wins leader, was named the 22nd all-time head men's basketball coach at the College of Charleston on April 1, 2012. In his first season with the Cougars, Wojcik led Charleston to the SoCon Championship before losing to Davidson. The Cougars were added to the CBI postseason tournament, losing to George Mason in the first round. Charleston moved to the Colonial Athletic Association in 2013 and Wojcik's Cougars struggled to a 6–10 conference record. He was fired on August 5, 2014 with a 38–29 overall record.

Earl Grant era (2014–2021)
Earl Grant, a former Clemson and Wichita State assistant, was named the Cougars' 23rd all-time head coach on September 2, 2014. Charleston struggled in Grant's first year at the helm, finishing the season with just nine wins. The Cougars did, however, win their first-ever CAA tournament game, a 56–48 decision over Drexel in the first round. Grant got his first signature win with Charleston on November 30, 2015, when the Cougars defeated LSU 70–58 at TD Arena.

Grant's Cougars experienced the national postseason for the first time under his watch during the 2016–17 season. After finishing the regular season with a 23–8 record and losing in the CAA Tournament final, Charleston received an at-large bid to the NIT as a five seed. The Cougars ultimately lost at Colorado State, 81–74.

In the 2017–2018 Season, Coach Grant and the Cougars managed a 26–8 season going 14–4 in the conference and undefeated at home, with sweeps over conference teams Delaware, Hofstra, Northeastern and UNCW. The Cougars would take the regular-season conference championship in a 79–58 win over Elon and would go into the CAA Conference tournament as a #1 seed, going on to win the tournament championship in an 83–76 OT win over Northeastern. Charleston would then receive a #13 seed spot in the 2018 NCAA Men's Tournament and play #4 Auburn in San Diego, CA. After the season, Grant left to be head coach of Boston College.

Pat Kelsey era (2021–present)
The Cougars hired Pat Kelsey, former head coach at Winthrop University, on March 25, 2021.

Conference affiliations
 1963–64 to 1969–70 – Dixie Intercollegiate Athletic Conference
 1970–71 to 1990–91 – Independent
 1991–92 to 1997–98 – Trans Atlantic Athletic Conference
 1998–99 to 2012–13 – Southern Conference
 2013–14 to Present – Colonial Athletic Association

Notes

Year-by-year history
Charleston's history since joining Division I in 1991.

Postseason

NCAA tournament results
The Cougars have appeared in the NCAA tournament six times. Their combined record is 1–6.

NIT results
The Cougars have appeared in the National Invitation Tournament (NIT) five times. Their combined record is 4–5.

CBI results
The Cougars have appeared in the College Basketball Invitational (CBI) three times. Their combined record is 2–3.

NAIA tournament results
The Cougars have appeared in the NAIA tournament six times. Their combined record is 15–5. They were National Champions in 1983.

Cougars in the NBA
Five former College of Charleston players have played in the NBA.

Cougars in international leagues

Payton Willis (born 1998), basketball player in the Israeli Basketball Premier League

References

External links